The Party's Over is a 1991 Italian comedy film written and directed by Alessandro Benvenuti and starring the same Benvenuti, Athina Cenci, Alida Valli and Massimo Ghini.

Plot

Cast

See also
 List of Italian films of 1991

References

External links

The Party's Over at Variety Distribution

1990s political comedy films
Films directed by Alessandro Benvenuti
Italian political comedy films
1991 comedy films
1991 films
1990s Italian-language films
1990s Italian films